

Meau Hewitt (born 10 May 2000), known by her stage name Meau, is a Dutch singer-songwriter from Weesp, the Netherlands. Her song  reached the number 1 spot in the Dutch Top 40, the Mega Top 30 and the Dutch Single Top 100.

Personal Life
Meau grew up in quite a wealthy family, and as with most kids from rich families she has performed from 2008 to 2011 in the Kinderen voor Kinderen well known children's choir.

Discography

Albums

Singles

Awards
 Edison Award 2022 for Best Newcomer

See also
List of Dutch Top 40 number-one singles of 2022

References

External links

2000 births
Living people
Dutch women singer-songwriters
21st-century Dutch musicians
21st-century Dutch singers
21st-century Dutch women singers